Holly Robinson may refer to:
Holly Robinson Peete, American actress, model and singer
Holly Robinson (athlete), New Zealand para-athlete
Holly Robinson (comics)